Daniel Broido (17 May 1903, Kirensk-1990) was a Russian-British engineer who played a significant role in the development of computers.

Daniel was the son of Mark Broido and Eva (née Lwowna) while they were political exiles in Kirensk, Siberia. They had been active Mensheviks and Eva had translated Women under Socialism by August Bebel into Russian.  She was active with an illegal workers library producing and distributing written material. She was arrested in January 1901 and, after 15 months in prison, sentenced to three to five years in exile in Siberia. The family returned to St Petersburg illegally, where his sister Vera Broido was born in 1907.

He moved to Germany and studied mechanical engineering in Berlin, and found work as an engineer working for Rotaprint. In 1934 Rotaprint sent him to London, where he settled. He remained in the United Kingdom during the Second World War, working for Caterpillar Tractors during World War II.

In 1956, Broido was appointed Chief Mechanical Engineer to work on the LEO computer.

References

1903 births
1990 deaths
Computer engineers
People from Kirensky District
Engineers from Berlin
Emigrants from the Russian Empire to Germany
German emigrants to the United Kingdom